Helicopter Combat Support Squadron 2 (HC-2), also known as the "Fleet Angels", was a multi-role helicopter squadron of the United States Navy based at Naval Air Station Jacksonville.  The squadron was established on 1 April 1948 and remained active until disestablished on 30 September 1977.

History
Early experience with helicopters by the U.S. Navy was begun with Helicopter Development Squadron 3 (VX-3), which operated out of Naval Air Station Lakehurst, New Jersey (USA).  This led to creation of the service's first two designated helicopter squadrons, Helicopter Utility Squadron 1 (HU-1) and HU-2 on 1 April 1948.  Both squadrons were given the nickname "Fleet Angels" and their full designation was Helicopter Utility Squadron, reflecting the multiple missions that these squadrons were expected to be able to complete.  In July 1965, HU-2 was re-designated Helicopter Combat Support Squadron 2 (HC-2).  After 25 years at NAS Lakehurst, the squadron was relocated to Naval Air Station Jacksonville, Florida (USA), where on 30 September 1977, the squadron would be disestablished due to budget constraints following nearly 30 years of service.

During the squadron's establishment, they would conduct a total of 2,318 rescues and achieve a list of naval helicopter firsts:
 First all-weather day/night detachment;
 First blimp rescue;
 First medical evacuation (MEDEVAC);
 First night Doppler rescue;
 First night full autorotation to a ship's flight deck;

After disestablishment, the squadron's traditions and the name "Fleet Angels" was picked up by the second HC-2 on 1 April 1987 at Naval Air Station Norfolk, Virginia, who continue to carry them to this day under the designation Helicopter Sea Combat Squadron 2 (HSC-2).

See also

 History of the United States Navy
 List of inactive United States Navy aircraft squadrons

References

Further reading
Marriott, Barbara. The Fleet Angels of Lakehurst: Their History, Heroics and Humor. Tucson, AZ: Loose Leaves Publishing, LLC, 2012.  

Helicopter combat support squadrons of the United States Navy